John Louis Berry (6 July 1880 – 1954) was an English footballer who played in the Football League for Bury.

References

1880 births
1954 deaths
English footballers
Association football forwards
English Football League players
Bury F.C. players